Marcelo Zilio Guimarães (born June 25, 1983) is a Brazilian mixed martial artist who competes in the welterweight division of the UFC.

Mixed martial arts career

Ultimate Fighting Championship
In his UFC debut, Guimarães faced Dan Stittgen on July 11, 2012 at UFC on Fuel TV 4. He won the fight via split decision.

Guimarães next fight was expected to take place on November 10, 2012 on UFC on Fuel TV: Le vs. Franklin against South Korean newcomer, Hyun Gyu Lim. However, he was forced out of the bout with an injury and replaced by David Mitchell.

Guimarães/Lim was rescheduled for March 3, 2013 at UFC on Fuel TV 8. Guimarães lost via second round KO when he was caught flush with a knee.

Guimarães was scheduled to face Keith Wisniewski on September 4, 2013 at UFC Fight Night 28.  However, Guimarães pulled out of the bout citing an injury and was replaced by Ivan Jorge.

Guimarães faced Andy Enz in a middleweight bout on June 28, 2014 at UFC Fight Night: Swanson vs. Stephens. He won the fight via split decision.

Guimarães faced Vitor Miranda on March 5, 2016 at UFC 196. He lost the fight via TKO in the second round.

Championships and accomplishments
Jungle Fight
Jungle Fight Middleweight Championship (One time)

Mixed martial arts record

|-
|Loss
| align=center|9–2–1
| Vitor Miranda
| TKO (head kick and punches) 
| UFC 196
| 
| align=center|2
| align=center|1:09
| Las Vegas, Nevada, United States
|
|-
| Win
| align=center| 9–1–1
| Andy Enz
| Decision (split)
| UFC Fight Night: Swanson vs. Stephens
| 
| align=center| 3
| align=center| 5:00
| San Antonio, Texas, United States
| 
|-
| Loss
| align=center| 8–1–1
| Hyun Gyu Lim
| KO (knee and punches)
| UFC on Fuel TV: Silva vs. Stann
| 
| align=center| 2
| align=center| 4:00
| Saitama, Japan
| 
|-
| Win
| align=center| 8–0–1
| Dan Stittgen
| Decision (split)
| UFC on Fuel TV: Munoz vs. Weidman
| 
| align=center| 3
| align=center| 5:00
| San Jose, California, United States
| 
|-
| Win
| align=center| 7–0–1
| Lucas Rota
| Technical Submission (rear-naked choke)
| Jungle Fight 31
| 
| align=center| 2
| align=center| 3:07
| Itu, Brazil
| 
|-
| Win
| align=center| 6–0–1
| Ildemar Alcântara
| Decision (unanimous)
| Jungle Fight 28
| 
| align=center| 3
| align=center| 5:00
| Rio de Janeiro, Brazil
| 
|-
| Win
| align=center| 5–0–1
| Paulo Rodrigues
| Decision (unanimous)
| Jungle Fight 25
| 
| align=center| 3
| align=center| 5:00
| Vila Velha, Brazil
| 
|-
| Win
| align=center| 4–0–1
| Erik Becker
| TKO (punches)
| Jungle Fight 22
| 
| align=center| 2
| align=center| 4:12
| São Paulo, Brazil
| 
|-
| Win
| align=center| 3–0–1
| Ivan Galaz
| Submission (rear-naked choke)
| Jungle Fight 20
| 
| align=center| 1
| align=center| 1:35
| São Paulo, Brazil
| 
|-
| Win
| align=center| 2–0–1
| Gilmar de Andrade
| Decision (unanimous)
| Jungle Fight 17: Vila Velha
| 
| align=center| 3
| align=center| 5:00
| Vila Velha, Brazil
| 
|-
| Draw
| align=center| 1–0–1
| Gilmar de Andrade
| Draw
| Vila Velha Fight Combat
| 
| align=center| 3
| align=center| 5:00
| Vila Velha, Brazil
| 
|-
| Win
| align=center| 1–0
| Willians Santos
| Decision (split)
| MMA: Kombat Espirito Santo
| 
| align=center| 3
| align=center| 5:00
| Vila Velha, Brazil
|

See also
 List of male mixed martial artists

References

External links
 
 

Brazilian male mixed martial artists
Welterweight mixed martial artists
Mixed martial artists utilizing wrestling
Mixed martial artists utilizing Brazilian jiu-jitsu
Living people
1983 births
Sportspeople from Espírito Santo
Brazilian practitioners of Brazilian jiu-jitsu
People awarded a black belt in Brazilian jiu-jitsu
Ultimate Fighting Championship male fighters